Ambulance is a video game written by Kent Stevenson for the TI-99/4A and released by Funware in 1983 in the United States.

Gameplay
The object of the game is to pick up patients and race them to the hospital. There is a limited amount of time to deliver the patients to the hospital and you must avoid the different obstacles on different levels.

References

1983 video games
Medical video games
TI-99/4A games
Video games developed in the United States

External links
 Ambulance at Pixelated Arcade
 Ambulance at TI-99/4A-Pedia
 Ambulance at TI-99/4A Video Game House